The Call of the Wild is a 1976 American television film based on Jack London's 1903 novel The Call of the Wild. The film, starring John Beck, was directed by Jerry Jameson from a script by the poet and novelist James Dickey. One of several adaptations of London's novel, this version was produced following the success of the 1972 film Deliverance, an adaptation of Dickey's novel of the same title. The author's son, Christopher Dickey, wrote in his 1998 memoir, Summer of Deliverance, that "[t]he Hollywood concept [for the 1976 film] was James Dickey meets Jack London; sort of Deliverance in the Klondike."

References

External links

1976 television films
1976 films
1976 drama films
1970s adventure drama films
1970s American films
1970s English-language films
Adventure television films
American adventure drama films
American drama television films
Films based on The Call of the Wild
Films directed by Jerry Jameson
NBC network original films
Television films based on books
Television shows based on works by Jack London